Oliver Simmons may refer to:
Oliver George Simmons (1878–1948), Wright brothers aviator
Oliver Simmons (Canadian politician) (1835–1903)

See also
Oliver Simmonds (1897–1985), British aviation pioneer and politician